The Sichuan deer (Cervus canadensis macneilli), also known as MacNeill's deer, is a subspecies of the Elk native to Western China.

Description
This large, highland deer is of very pale, finely spotted color with gray or brownish black. The winter coat is of a brownish wash.  These deer, along with the Tibetan red deer, are the largest subspecies of Central Asian red deer.  Older adult males may carry six tines on each antler similar to wapiti subspecies.  Also, unlike other Central Asian red deer subspecies, females do have short neck manes during the winter.

Range/discovery
This rare deer was first described in 1909 from a female specimen. 26 years later, male specimens were found and its true status became known. It lives in along the Chinese-Tibetan border.

References

Elk and red deer